Nirjala Raut is a Nepalese politician and a member of the House of Representatives of the federal parliament of Nepal. She was elected under the proportional representation system from Rastriya Janata Party Nepal. She is also a member of the parliamentary International Relations Committee. Previously, she was also a member of the second constituent assembly, also elected under the proportional representation system, from Rastriya Madhes Samajwadi Party.

References

Living people
21st-century Nepalese women politicians
21st-century Nepalese politicians
Rastriya Janata Party Nepal politicians
Place of birth missing (living people)
Nepal MPs 2017–2022
Members of the 2nd Nepalese Constituent Assembly
Loktantrik Samajwadi Party, Nepal politicians
People's Socialist Party, Nepal politicians
1968 births